Thelymitra mucida, commonly called the plum sun orchid or plum orchid, is a species of orchid that is endemic to southern Australia. It has a single erect, fleshy, linear leaf and up to six blue, purplish or plum coloured flowers with a thick, sticky secretion on the anther lobe.

Description
The lobe on the top of the anther is purplish with a yellow tip, wedge shaped and covered with a thick, sticky secretion. The end of the lobe is deeply notched. The side lobes have shaggy toothbrush-like yellow or cream-coloured tufts on their ends. The flowers are self-pollinated and only open on hot days, and then only slowly. Flowering occurs from August to December.

Taxonomy and naming
Thelymitra mucida was first formally described in 1879 by Robert Fitzgerald from a specimen collected near Wilson Inlet and the description was published in The Gardeners' Chronicle. The specific epithet (mucida) is a Latin word meaning "slimy".

Distribution and habitat
The plum sun orchid grows in moist places such as swamp margins in heath. It occurs in southern parts of Victoria, South Australia, (including Kangaroo Island) and Western Australia and in Tasmania.

Conservation
Thelymitra mucida is listed as "vulnerable" in Victoria, as "endangered" in South Australia and as "rare" under the Threatened Species Protection Act 1995 in Tasmania.

References

mucida
Endemic orchids of Australia
Orchids of Tasmania
Orchids of Victoria (Australia)
Orchids of South Australia
Orchids of Western Australia
Plants described in 1882